T. J. Roulhac High School was a public secondary school in Chipley, Florida. It served as the high school for black students until the public schools were integrated in 1968.

History

Chipley Colored School was founded in 1938. It was for a short time known as Washington County Colored School. Two thirds of the funding came from the Jeanes Foundation program known as the Negro Rural School Fund, and one third from the Washington County School Board. It was housed in various churches.

In 1941, the school was renamed for its founder and first principal T.J. Roulhac.

The existing buildings were constructed starting in 1950.

In 1968 with desegregation, grades nine through twelve were discontinued and the school renamed Roulhac Middle School. Roulhac students were transferred to Chipley High School, and some to Vernon High School At that time, graduating classes consisted of approximately 10 students.

In 2000, Roulhac Middle School moved to a new campus on Brickyard Road.

Founder and namesake
In 1913 T.J. Roulhac, a man with no formal training, became the supervisor of Washington County's black schools. In 1938, the school expanded to include high school, and Roulhac became the principal.

Notable people
Artis Gilmore attended Roulhac before transferring to Chipley High School for one week, then went to George Washington Carver High School in Dothan, Alabama his senior year.

References

Historically segregated African-American schools in Florida
Public high schools in Florida
Historically black schools
Defunct black public schools in the United States that closed when schools were integrated
Schools in Washington County, Florida